MV Cape Kennedy (T-AKR 5083) is one of the United States Military Sealift Command's 27 Roll-on/Roll-off Ships and one of the 44 Ready Reserve Force (RRF) ships in the Sealift Program Office.

References
 
 Navsource

External links
 

Transports of the United States Navy
1978 ships